The 2016–17 French Basketball Cup season was the 40th season of the domestic cup competition of French basketball. The competition started on September 9, 2016 and ended on April 22, 2017. Nanterre 92 won its second Cup title.

Bracket

Final

See also
2016–17 Pro A season

References

External links
French Basketball Federation Official Site 

French Basketball Cup
Cup